Belasis Lane railway station served the ICI Billingham Manufacturing Plant in the town of Billingham, County Durham, England from 1928 to 1964 on the Port Clarence branch of the former Clarence Railway which had become part of the London and North Eastern Railway by the time the station opened.

History 
The station was opened in May 1928 by the London and North Eastern Railway (LNER) on its branch to Port Clarence which had been opened by the Clarence Railway (a predecessor of the LNER) in 1833. It was situated a short distance to the east of the junction between the former Clarence Railway and the former Stockton and Hartlepool Railway (now part of the Durham Coast Line).

Regular passenger services on the Port Clarence branch (which had only run as far as Haverton Hill since 1939) were withdrawn completely on 14 June 1954 but due to its location being close to the ICI plant, Belasis Lane station remained open to the services for workmen until 6 November 1961 and goods traffic until 2 November 1964. The line through the station remains open to freight traffic and provides access to the oil terminal and storage facilities at Seal Sands.

References

External links 

Disused railway stations in the Borough of Stockton-on-Tees
Former London and North Eastern Railway stations
Railway stations in Great Britain opened in 1928
Railway stations in Great Britain closed in 1964
1928 establishments in England
1964 disestablishments in England
Billingham